The Tonga women's national rugby union team are a national sporting side of Tonga, representing them at rugby union.

History
Tonga played their first international test match against Fiji in 2006 at the Women's Pacific Tri-Nations. Tonga joined the Oceania Rugby Women's Championship in 2018. They recorded their first and biggest win at the 2018 Oceania Championship over Papua New Guinea with a score of 62–26.

There was a measles outbreak in Tonga in 2019, so the team had to withdraw from the Oceania Championship when a player was suspected of having measles. The tournament also acted as a qualifier for the 2021 Rugby World Cup and was revised to allow Tonga to compete for the Oceania berth. Fiji won the Oceania regions only spot and qualified for the World Cup.

In 2020 Tonga played Papua New Guinea and Samoa in a Repechage qualifier playoff for a spot in the Final Qualification Tournament for the 2021 World Cup. Samoa were the team to progress.

Tonga placed third at the 2022 Oceania Rugby Championship.

Results
See Women's international rugby for information about the status of international games and match numbering

(Full internationals only)

Overall record

Full internationals

2000s

2010s

2020s

References

External links
 Official site
 Tongan rugby union news from Planet Rugby
 Tongan Rugby News

Women's national rugby union teams
Oceanian national women's rugby union teams
W